Prince Peeter Volkonski (born 12 September 1954 in Tallinn) is an Estonian rock-musician, composer, actor, and theatre director.

Biography
He became famous with the punk band Propeller, founded in 1978.

In 2015 Volkonski was Free Party's candidate in the Tartu constituency for Estonian parliamentary election. He received 916 votes, which was not enough for a seat in the parliament.

Ancestry
Peeter Volkonski's paternal ancestry comes from the Russian noble Volkonsky family; his father was the Russian composer and harpsichordist Prince Andrei Volkonsky. His paternal grandfather was the noted Russian opera baritone Prince  and his great-great-great-grandfather was Prince Pyotr Mikhailovich Volkonsky, thus, being a descendant of the princely Rurikid dynasty.

His maternal ancestry is Estonian; his mother is the Estonian translator and writer , who is a noted poet and author of children's literature.

Decorations
2001 Fifth Class Order of the White Star of the Republic of Estonia.

References

External links

Potpourri Volkonski/Propeller https://web.archive.org/web/20110720131601/http://www.volk.ee/24345.mp3

1954 births
Living people
Peeter
Russian princes
Estonian people of Russian descent
Estonian rock singers
20th-century Estonian male singers
Estonian Academy of Music and Theatre alumni
21st-century Estonian male singers
Recipients of the Order of the White Star, 5th Class